CSR Group Corporation formerly known as China South Locomotive and Rolling Stock Industry (Group) Corporation (abbreviation: CSRG), was a Chinese locomotive and rolling stock manufacturer. In 2007, the major assets of the group was spin-off and formed CSR Corporation Limited, making the corporation became a holding company only. In 2015 CSR Group was merged with CNR Group to form CRRC Group.

History
In 2002 LORIC was separated from the Ministry of Railways and China South Locomotive and Rolling Stock Industry (Group) Corporation (CSRG) was formed. Its main competitor, the China North Locomotive and Rolling Stock Industry (Group) Corporation was formed in the same year .

In 2002 the group manufactured the  China Star high speed EMU at the Zhuzhou Electric Locomotive Works.

Since 2003, the group no longer tax-free on property tax and land rent.

Between 2004 and 2007 CSR had ~50% of the internal Chinese market for locomotives and ~80% of the market for multiple units (by volume), as well as a ~50% share in locomotive and wagon refurbishment. In the same period overseas sales accounted for ~7-8% of revenue.

In 2008 most of the assets were floated as China South Locomotive & Rolling Stock Corp., Ltd. (later known as CSR Corporation Limited), except some auxiliary assets, as well as the shares of South Huiton.

In April 2010 the Chinese name of CSR Group was renamed.

Subsidiaries
 CSR Corporation Limited
 South Huiton (42.64%)
 Beijing Railway Industry Trade Corporation

References

External links

Holding companies of China
Defunct government-owned companies of China
Ministry of Railways of China